Q110 may refer to:
Quran 110, 
Q110, New York bus route